Mytilinidiales is an order of fungi within the class Dothideomycetes.

References

External links
 

 
Ascomycota orders